Mary Wiegold’s Songbook is a collection of songs for soprano and, usually, an ensemble of two clarinets, viola, cello and double bass which were written at the invitation of the soprano Mary Wiegold and the composer John Woolrich. Around two hundred songs were collected, mostly written within a ten year period from the late 1980s.

The Songbook is ‘like a modern day codex- should nothing survive from the previous decade of British music save this, scholars would be able to form a reliable picture of the diverse compositional activity of those years.’
(Tempo)

Selected list of songs 

Thomas Adès		Life Story (Faber Music)
Milton Babbitt		Quatrains
Simon Bainbridge        A Song from Michelangelo (Musicsales)
Harrison Birtwistle	Night (UniversalEdition/Boosey)
Harrison Birtwistle	Tenebrae (Universal Edition/Boosey)
Harrison Birtwistle	White and Light (Universal Edition/Boosey)
Gavin Bryars The Adnan Songbook No.5 (Schott)
Niccolo Castiglioni	Vallis Clausa (Ricordi)
Aldo Clementi		Wiegenlied (ESZ)
Elvis Costello		The Trouble with Dreams
Franco Donatoni		An angel within my heart (Ricordi)
Detlev Glanert            Contemplated by a Portrait of a Divine (Boosey)
Vinko Globokar		Letters (Ricordi)
Osvaldo Golijov		Sarajevo
Lou Harrison 		Vestiunt Silve
Jonathan Harvey		You (Faber Music)
James MacMillan	Scots Song (Boosey)
Colin Matthews           Cantata on the Death of Antony (Faber Music)
Nicholas Maw		The Head of Orpheus (Faber Music)
Dominic Muldowney    On Suicide (Faber Music)
Olga Neuwirth		The Cartographer Song (Boosey)
Michael Nyman		Polish Love Song (Musicsales)
Tom Phillips Six of Hearts
Poul Ruders		Alone (Musicsales)
Kurt Schwertsik          Das Herr weis was der wil (Boosey)
Kurt Schwertsik          Human Existence (Boosey)
Kurt Schwertsik          singt meine schwäne (Boosey)
Peter Sculthorpe From Nourlangie (Faber)
Salvatore Sciarrino	Due Risvegli e il Vento (Ricordi)
John Tavener	The Child Lived (Musicsales)
John Woolrich             The Turkish Mouse (Faber Music)

Discography 

Thomas Adès		Life Story
Mary Carewe/Thomas Adès  EMI

Claron McFadden/Composers Ensemble/Thomas Adès  EMI
 
Dora Ohrenstein/Alan Kay/Michael Lowenstern/Jeremy McCoy   Koch International

Milton Babbitt		Quatrains
Tony Arnold, Charles Neidich and Ayako Oshima Bridge 9135

Simon Bainbridge	A Song from Michelangelo
Mary Wiegold/Composers Ensemble/Dominic Muldowney  NMCD003

Sally Beamish		Tuscan Lullaby
Mary Wiegold/Composers Ensemble/Dominic Muldowney  NMCD003

David Bedford		Even Now
Mary Wiegold/Composers Ensemble/Dominic Muldowney  NMCD003

Harrison Birtwistle		White and Light
Claron McFadden/Nash Ensemble/Reinbert de Leeuw  Teldec Classics 3984-26867-2

Christine Whittlesey/EIC/Pierre Boulez 	DG 439 910-2

Mary Wiegold/Composers Ensemble/Dominic Muldowney NMCD003

Harrison Birtwistle		Tenebrae
Claron McFadden/Nash Ensemble/Reinbert de Leeuw  Teldec Classics 3984-26867-2

Christine Whittlesey/EIC/Pierre Boulez	DG 439 910-2

Harrison Birtwistle		Night
Claron McFadden/Nash Ensemble/Reinbert de Leeuw  Teldec Classics 3984-26867-2

Christine Whittlesey/EIC/Pierre Boulez	DG 439 910-2

Gavin Bryars    The Adnan Songbook No.5
Valdine Anderson/Gavin Bryars Ensemble  Philips

Lou Harrison    Vestiunt Silve
Patrice Maginnis/The California Parallèlle Ensemble/Nicole Paiement Mode 122

James MacMillan   Scots Song
Alison Smart/Katharine Durran  Metier MSVCD92025

Colin Matthews		Cantata on the Death of Antony
Mary Wiegold/Composers Ensemble/Dominic Muldowney NMCD003

Colin Matthews		Strugnell's Haiku
Mary Wiegold/Composers Ensemble/Dominic Muldowney NMCD003

Dominic Muldowney	On Suicide
Mary Wiegold/Composers Ensemble/Dominic Muldowney NMCD003

Bayan Northcott		The maidens came
Mary Wiegold/Composers Ensemble/Dominic Muldowney  NMCD003

Michael Nyman		Polish Song
Mary Wiegold/Composers Ensemble/Dominic Muldowney  NMCD003

Tom Phillips		Six of Hearts
Mary Wiegold/Composers Ensemble/John Woolrich	 Largo 5138

Tom Phillips		Mine is the Life Song
Mary Wiegold/Mark van de Wiel		Largo 5138

Peter Sculthorpe From Nourlangie
Margaret Schindler/Perihelion Artworks CD (AW032)

Howard Skempton 	How Slow the Wind
Mary Wiegold/Composers Ensemble/Dominic Muldowney  NMCD003

Milan Slavicky		Veni, Sancte Spiritus
Lenka Skornickova/Mondschein
Matous MK 0051-2 931

John Tavener  The Child Lived
Felicity Lott/Steven Isserlis  RCA Victor 09026 68928 2

Keith Tippett		Sun- the Living Son
Mary Wiegold/Composers Ensemble/Keith Tippett  NMCD003

Jane Wells			One to Another
Mary Wiegold/Composers Ensemble/Peter Wiegold 
Metier: MSVCD92043

Judith Weir			The Romance of Count Arnaldos
Mary Wiegold/Composers Ensemble/Dominic Muldowney  NMCD003

Philip Wilby		Easter Wings
Mary Wiegold/Composers Ensemble/Dominic Muldowney  NMCD003

John Woolrich		The Turkish Mouse
Mary Wiegold/Composers Ensemble/Dominic Muldowney  NMCD003

References

Bibliography
Robert Adlington The Music of Harrison Birtwistle (Cambridge University Press 2006)
Jean-Yves Bosseur Tom Phillips- Sound of My Life (Delatour 2015)
Jonathan Cross Harrison Birtwistle: Man, Mind, Music (Faber 2000)
Michael Hall Harrison Birtwistle in Recent Years (Robson Books 1998)
Jane Manning The New Vocal Repertoire 2 (OUP Oxford 1998)

Song books